Polychrome brickwork is a style of architectural brickwork wherein bricks of different colours are used to create decorative patterns or highlight architectural features in the walls of a building. Historically it was used in the late Gothic period in Europe, and the Tudor period in England, and was revived in Britain in the 1850s as a feature of Gothic Revival architecture. Later in the 19th century and into the early 20th century it was adopted in various forms in Europe for all manner of buildings such as French eclectic villas, Dutch row houses, and German railway stations, and as far away as Melbourne, Australia, where the technique reached heights of popularity and elaboration in the 1880s.

Beginnings in the British Gothic Revival 

The revival of polychrome brickwork is generally thought to have been instigated by British critic and architectural theorist John Ruskin, in his 1849 book The Seven Lamps of Architecture, where he lauded not only Medieval and Gothic architecture as 'truer' than the Classical, but also the ‘honest’ medieval use of materials as both structure and decoration, above the use of applied colours or veneered materials. He gave as examples Tuscan and Venetian Romanesque and Gothic buildings such as the Doge's Palace in Venice, which has a facade of white stone and pink marble in a diaper pattern (which is in fact a veneer). Other theorists and architects at the same time were also exploring the medieval use of materials in this way, later described as ‘constructional polychromy’. While some designers had already used more than one colour of brick, William Butterfield made lavish use of the technique in his All Saints Margaret Street, built between 1850–59, with an exterior of banded and diaper patterned brickwork in black and cream on a red brick background.  Butterfield went on to use polychrome brick in more projects, and other architects also adopted the new technique at the same time. For example  George Edmund Street used black bricks on a red background in his 1858–61 St James the Less in Pimlico, considered one of his finest designs, and George Gilbert Scott used black brick stripes on a red background on the Sandbach Literary Institution in 1857.

The use of coloured brick effects became quite popular in Gothic Revival across the United Kingdom, often in combination with stone, usually with far less elaboration that Butterfield. Some architects in the 1870s-80s were more enthusiastic, such as in the work of Watson Fothergill in Nottingham, and in Bristol in the 1860s-80s it was often used is what is now known as 'Bristol Byzantine' style, for instance the 1869 Welsh Back Granary.

Use in Europe 
Polychrome brickwork also became popular in Europe in the later 19th century as part of the various medieval and Romanesque revivals. In France the Menier Chocolate Factory in Noisiel, designed by Jules Saulnier and completed in 1872, is an early and very elaborate example, which is also noted for its early use of iron structure. Later the use of two tone brickwork was popular in eclectic picturesque villas, as well as other building types. Examples, again usually restrained use of two colours, can also be found in Belgium, the Netherlands, and Germany 'Gründerzeit' style buildings sometimes employed decorative brick.

Use in Australasia

In Australia, the first use of polychrome brickwork is generally attributed to architect Joseph Reed's Independent Church (now St Michaels) in Melbourne's Collins Street, completed in 1866, closely followed by St Jude's in Carlton. Architects such as Crouch & Wilson and Percy Oakden soon also employed it on church design, while Reed also applied it on houses, notably the Rippon Lea Estate. Most of the State Schools built in the 1870s-80s were in a brick Gothic style with at least two colours. Rare examples of its use can be found in Sydney and Brisbane, however it is most prevalent in Melbourne, where it began, and where it became increasingly popular, reaching a peak in the boom years of the 1880s when it was used extensively on all manner of buildings from terrace houses to villas, from shops to factories.

Early New Zealand examples are All Saints' Church, Dunedin and Lisburn House Dunedin, New Zealand both designed by Mason and Wales architects.

Examples

Notable examples of its application include:

Historic examples

 Santa Maria e San Donato, Murano, Veneto, Italy, 12th Century
 Château de Blois, main front Louis XII wing, Loire Valley France
Fulham Palace, London, late 15th century, all walls in diaper pattern black brick on red brick.
The Vynne, Hampshire, late 16th century.

Nineteenth Century

Great Britain and Ireland

 Sandbach Literary Institution, George Gilbert Scott, 1857
St James the Less, Pimlico, George Edmond Street, 1861
House, 24 Cornhill Market, Banbury, UK, William Wilkinson, 1866
Granary, Welsh Back, Bristol, 1869 by Archibald Ponton and William Venn Gough
Midland Hotel at St Pancras railway station (1866–76)
Keble College, Oxford (1870)
Royal Albert Memorial Museum, Exeter (1868)
St Augustine's, Queen's Gate, London (1865)
Naas Presbyterian Church (1868)
Exeter School (1878)
Mageough Home (1878)
Templeton carpet factory, Glasgow (1889–92)
Offices, George Street, Nottingham, Watson Fothergills, 1895
Europe
 Reuss Stables, Greiz, 1870
 Menier Chocolate Factory, Noisiel, designed by Jules Saulnier, 1872
Water tower, Gutenbergstrasse, Krefeld, 1872–77
Potsdam Astrophysical Observatory (now Potsdam Institute for Climate Impact Research), Emanuel Spieker, 1879
Maison Le Castel, Vichy, 1893
 Villa mon Plesir, Vichy, France, 1894
 Luisenhaus, Gesundbrunnen, Berlin, 1893
Maurice Bisschops house, Avenue de la Couronne, Brussels, 1895
Villa Germaine, Avenue Palmerston 24, Brussels, 1897
Grand Market Hall, Budapest, 1897
Australasia
St Michael's Uniting Church, Melbourne (1866)
Rippon Lea Estate Ripponlea, Victoria (1868)
 Cambridge Terrace Carlton, Victoria (1873)
 St George's Uniting Church St Kilda East, Victoria (1877)
Boag's Brewery Launceston, Tasmania (1880s)
 Yorkshire Brewery Collingwood, Victoria (1880)
 Holcombe Terrace Carlton, Victoria (1884)
 Denton Hat Mills Abbotsford, Victoria (1888)
Old Museum Building, Brisbane (1891)
 Church of England Mission Hall, Little Bourke Street, Melbourne (1894)
All Saints' Church, Dunedin (1865)
 Lisburn House Dunedin, New Zealand (1865)

See also 
 Bristol Byzantine

Gallery

References

Brick buildings and structures
Bricks
Color
Victorian architectural styles